Yongtaizhuang station is a station on Line 8 of the Beijing Subway.

Station Layout 
The station has an underground island platform.

Exits 
There are 2 exits, lettered A and C. Exit C is accessible.

References

External links 

Beijing Subway stations in Haidian District